Smilax is an unincorporated community located in Leslie County, Kentucky, United States.

References

Unincorporated communities in Leslie County, Kentucky
Unincorporated communities in Kentucky